An optical lattice is formed by the interference of counter-propagating laser beams, creating a spatially periodic polarization pattern. The resulting periodic potential may trap neutral atoms via the Stark shift. Atoms are cooled and congregate at the potential extrema (at maxima for blue-detuned lattices, and minima for red-detuned lattices). The resulting arrangement of trapped atoms resembles a crystal lattice and can be used for quantum simulation.

Atoms trapped in the optical lattice may move due to quantum tunneling, even if the potential well depth of the lattice points exceeds the kinetic energy of the atoms, which is similar to the electrons in a conductor. However, a superfluid–Mott insulator transition may occur, if the interaction energy between the atoms becomes larger than the hopping energy when the well depth is very large. In the Mott insulator phase, atoms will be trapped in the potential minima and cannot move freely, which is similar to the electrons in an insulator. In the case of Fermionic atoms, if the well depth is further increased the atoms are predicted to form an antiferromagnetic, i.e. Néel state at sufficiently low temperatures.

Parameters 

There are two important parameters of an optical lattice: the potential well depth and the periodicity.

Control of potential depth 
The potential experienced by the atoms is related to the intensity of the laser used to generate the optical lattice. The potential depth of the optical lattice can be tuned in real time by changing the power of the laser, which is normally controlled by an acousto-optic modulator (AOM). The AOM is tuned to deflect a variable amount of the laser power into the optical lattice. Active power stabilization of the lattice laser can be accomplished by feedback of a photodiode signal to the AOM.

Control of periodicity 
The periodicity of the optical lattice can be tuned by changing the wavelength of the laser or by changing the relative angle between the two laser beams. The real-time control of the periodicity of the lattice is still a challenging task. The wavelength of the laser cannot easily be varied over a large range in real time, and so the periodicity of the lattice is normally controlled by the relative angle between the laser beams. However, it is difficult to keep the lattice stable while changing the relative angles, since the interference is sensitive to the relative phase between the laser beams. Titanium-sapphire lasers, with their large tunable range, provide a possible platform for direct tuning of wavelength in optical lattice systems.

Continuous control of the periodicity of a one-dimensional optical lattice while maintaining trapped atoms in-situ was first demonstrated in 2005 using a single-axis servo-controlled galvanometer.  This "accordion lattice" was able to vary the lattice periodicity from 1.30 to 9.3 μm. More recently, a different method of real-time control of the lattice periodicity was demonstrated, in which the center fringe moved less than 2.7 μm while the lattice periodicity was changed from 0.96 to 11.2 μm. Keeping atoms (or other particles) trapped while changing the lattice periodicity remains to be tested more thoroughly experimentally. Such accordion lattices are useful for controlling ultracold atoms in optical lattices, where small spacing is essential for quantum tunneling, and large spacing enables single-site manipulation and spatially resolved detection. Site-resolved detection of the occupancy of lattice sites of both bosons and fermions within a high tunneling regime is regularly performed in quantum gas microscopes.

Principle of operation 
A basic optical lattice is formed by the interference pattern of two counter-propagating laser beams. The trapping mechanism is via the Stark shift, where off-resonant light causes shifts to an atom's internal structure. The effect of the Stark shift is to create a potential proportional to the intensity. This is the same trapping mechanism as in optical dipole traps (ODTs), with the only major difference being that the intensity of an optical lattice has a much more dramatic spatial variation than a standard ODT.

The energy shift to (and thus, the potential experienced by) an electronic ground state  is given by second-order time-independent perturbation theory, where the rapid time variation of the lattice potential at optical frequencies has been time-averaged.where  are the transition matrix elements for transitions from the ground state  to the excited states . For a two-level system, this simplifies towhere  is the linewidth of the excited state transition.

An alternative picture of the stimulated light forces due to the AC Stark effect is to view the process as a stimulated Raman process, where the atom redistributes photons between the counterpropagating laser beams which form the lattice.

Technical challenges 
The trapping potential experienced by atoms in an optical dipole trap is weak, generally below 1 mK. Thus atoms must be cooled significantly before loading them into the optical lattice. Cooling techniques used to this end include magneto-optical traps, Doppler cooling, polarization gradient cooling, Raman cooling, resolved sideband cooling, and evaporative cooling.

Once cold atoms are loaded into the optical lattice, they will experience heating by various mechanisms such as spontaneous scattering of photons from the optical lattice lasers. These mechanisms generally limit the lifetime of optical lattice experiments.

Time of flight imaging 
Once cooled and trapped in an optical lattice, they can be manipulated or left to evolve. Common manipulations involve the "shaking" of the optical lattice by varying the relative phase between the counterpropagating beams, or amplitude modulation of the lattice. After evolving in response to the lattice potential and any manipulations, the atoms can be imaged via absorption imaging.

A common observation technique is time of flight (TOF) imaging. TOF imaging works by first waiting some amount of time for the atoms to evolve in the lattice potential, then turning off the lattice potential (by switching off the laser power with an AOM). The atoms, now free, spread out at different rates according to their momenta. By controlling the amount of time the atoms are allowed to evolve, the distance travelled by atoms maps onto what their momentum state must have been when the lattice was turned off. Using TOF imaging, the momentum distribution of atoms in the lattice can be determined. Combined with in-situ absorption images (taken with the lattice still on), this is enough to determine the phase space density of the trapped atoms, an important metric for diagnosing Bose–Einstein condensation (or more generally, the formation of quantum degenerate phases of matter).

Uses

Quantum simulation 
Atoms in an optical lattice provide an ideal quantum system where all parameters can be controlled. Because atoms can be imaged directly – something difficult to do with electrons in solids – they can be used to study effects that are difficult to observe in real crystals. Quantum gas microscopy techniques applied to trapped atom optical-lattice systems can even provide single-site imaging resolution of their evolution.

By interfering differing numbers of beams in various geometries, varying lattice geometries can be created. These range from the simplest case of two counterpropagating beams forming a one-dimensional lattice, to more complex geometries like hexagonal lattices. The variety of geometries that can be produced in optical lattice systems allow the physical realization of different Hamiltonians, such as the Bose–Hubbard model, the Kagome lattice and Sachdev–Ye–Kitaev model, and the Aubry–André model. By studying the evolution of atoms under the influence of these Hamiltonians, insight about the solutions to the Hamiltonian can be gained. This is particularly relevant to complicated Hamiltonians which are not easily solvable using theoretical or numerical techniques, such as those for strongly correlated systems.

Optical clocks 
The best atomic clocks in the world use atoms trapped in optical lattices, to obtain narrow spectral lines that are unaffected by the Doppler effect and recoil.

Quantum information 
They are also promising candidates for quantum information processing.

Atom interferometry 
Shaken optical lattices – where the phase of the lattice is modulated, causing the lattice pattern to scan back and forth – can be used to control the momentum state of the atoms trapped in the lattice. This control is exercised to split the atoms into populations of different momenta, propagate them to accumulate phase differences between the populations, and recombine them to produce an interference pattern.

Other uses 
Besides trapping cold atoms, optical lattices have been widely used in creating gratings and photonic crystals.  They are also useful for sorting microscopic particles, and may be useful for assembling cell arrays.

See also 

 Bose–Hubbard model
 Ultracold atom
 List of laser articles
 Electromagnetically induced grating
Magic wavelength

References

External links 

 More about optical lattices
 Introduction to optical lattices
 Optical lattice on arxiv.org

Quantum optics
Atomic physics